The 2013 UIM F1 H2O World Championship was the 30th season of Formula 1 Powerboat racing. For the first time in the championship's history, there was an event held in South America, with the first race of the year taking place in Brasilia on 1 and 2 June. In addition, the series' 250th race since it began in 1981 took place on 2 October at the Grand Prix of China in Liuzhou.

Alex Carella, driving for the Qatar Team, successfully defended his world championship for the second year in a row, ensuring he became only the second driver in the history of the championship to win three consecutive world titles, after Guido Cappellini.

Teams and drivers

Team changes
All nine full-time teams from 2012 continued into the 2013 season, although Team Sweden revisited a title sponsorship agreement with the country of Azerbaijan which saw the outfit rebranded to Team Azerbaijan, a partnership last formed back in 2010. None of the part-time teams that participated in 2012 were present for the opening round in Brazil, however there was speculation that Dragon Racing would at some point rejoin the series, as would Jay Price, the 2008 champion who drove for the other part-time team in 2012, Skydive Dubai. Neither of these teams ultimately entered the championship however.

Caudwell Racing were forced to miss the first race of the year in Brazil due to their new boats not being ready in time. After it was initially believed that they would join the rest of the field at the second race of the season in Ukraine, as in Brazil Caudwell were not present. Shortly before the third race at Liuzhou, the South African team made the announcement that they would be returning to the fold in Qatar for the fourth race, citing "unprecedented shipping challenges" for their delay. The delay however allowed the team to design an all-new hull and make major refinements to their revolutionary four-stroke engine.

Driver changes
Following his two race ban at the end of the 2012 season, Shaun Torrente returned to the Qatar Team to partner reigning double world champion Alex Carella. Neither Terry Rinker who filled in for Torrente, nor Khalid Al Shamlan, the Qatari who raced for the team for one race in 2012, were announced as drivers.

Ahmed Al Hameli was initially expected to miss out on racing in 2013 following surgery on a brain tumour mid-way through the 2012 season which forced his withdrawal, with Rashed Al Tayer, rather than Majed Al Mansoori who had replaced Al Hameli in 2012, taking his place at Team Abu Dhabi. However just a week prior to the first race of the year in Brazil, Al Hameli announced that he had been cleared by doctors to participate in the championship, completing a remarkable recovery that would allow him to challenge for a championship which he had been favourite to win prior to his operation in 2012.

After a promising debut in the final two races of 2012, Chinese driver Xiong Ziwei was handed a full-time drive alongside regular Team CTIC China driver Philippe Chiappe, following the retirement of veteran Russian driver Stanislav Kurtsenovskiy. At the F1 Atlantic Team, Phillipe Toure didn't return for 2013, ensuring that the outfit would run with just two full-time boats for the year, with Duarte Benavente and Youssef Al Rubayan continuing on.

Jonas Andersson continued at the renamed Team Azerbaijan for 2013, and after having a number of different drivers in the team's second boat in 2012, announced that Norwegian veteran Pal Virik Nilsen would make his debut in F1 at Brazil alongside the Swede. Brazilian Paul Gaiser also entered for Team Azerbaijan in a third boat at his home event having last raced in F1 back in 2001, 12 years previously. Prior to the Brazilian race, Gaiser announced that it would be his last and would retire from racing afterwards, describing F1 as "a sport for the young". Gaiser was forced to withdraw from the Brazilian event however after injuring his wrist, and subsequently reversed his decision to retire, indicating that he would return to the boat for the next race in Ukraine. This failed to materialise though, and alongside Andersson in Kiev was fellow Swede Tommy Wahlsten, replacing Nilsen. But by China, Andersson had a third driver in as many races in his second boat, with recently crowned 2013 USF1 champion Terry Rinker taking the drive as the American returned to the series after a brief cameo in 2012. Rinker drove the second Azerbaijan boat until the final race of the year where Wahlsten found himself back in as number two to see out the year.

Both Francesco Cantando and Valerio Lagiannella stayed on at the Singha F1 Racing Team, and would be joined in a third boat by Polish driver Bartek Marszalek at the second round in Ukraine. Joining Cantando and Marszalek in China was Rhys Coles, the Australian driving Lagiannella's #23 DAC boat having last made an appearance in the series in 2012 in a one-off drive for Team Sweden at the Grand Prix of Qatar. Prior to his involvement with Singha, Marszalek had last raced in the series in 2011, competing in five races in a third boat for Team Nautica. Nautica were one of two teams who had unchanged line-ups for 2013, along with Mad Croc Baba Racing. Caudwell Racing retained Ivan Brigada when they eventually joined the series at the fourth race in Qatar, with South African Paul Shepard making his debut alongside the Italian.

Season calendar

An initial calendar of eight races was released by the UIM at the beginning of 2013, including Brazil, and thus South America for the first time in the history of the F1 Powerboat World Championship. However the Grand Prix of Tatarstan, due to be the third race of the year and held at the end of August, was cancelled on 29 April, with the Russian authorities in Kazan, where the race was to be held, hoping to reintroduce the event for 2014. This meant the calendar dropped to seven races for the 2013 season, and was the first season that an event wasn't held in Russia since 2007. As part of the seven race calendar, there were to be two back-to-back races in China, and whilst Liuzhou was announced as the second of the two races upon the calendar's release, it took some time for a first race to be confirmed. Eventually Shanghai was announced as the venue at the beginning of May, and would have been the 250th race in the championship's history. However less than three months later towards the end of July, the event was pulled from the calendar, leaving six races to make up the schedule, and Liuzhou to take the title of the historic 250th GP.

Results and standings
Points were awarded to the top 10 classified finishers. A maximum of two boats per team were eligible for points in the teams' championship.

Drivers standings

Teams standings
Only boats with results eligible for points counting towards the teams' championship are shown here.

References

External links
 The official website of the UIM F1 H2O World Championship
 The official website of the Union Internationale Motonautique

F1 Powerboat World Championship
Formula 1 Powerboat seasons
F1 Powerboat World Championship